The 1999–2000 National Football League, also known as the Coca-Cola National Football League for sponsorship reasons, was the fourth season of National Football League, the top Indian league for association football clubs, since its inception in 1996.

Overview
It was contested by 12 teams, and Mohun Bagan won the championship under the coach Subrata Bhattacharya. This is their second National Football League title. Churchill Brothers came second and Salgaonkar came third. For the first time, the tournament was played without any group stage (as that was followed in previous seasons) and in "Home and Away" system. Dempo and BSF (Border Security Force) were relegated from the National Football League.

League standings

References

External links 
 4th "Coca Cola" National Football League at Rec.Sport.Soccer Statistics Foundation

National Football League (India) seasons
1999–2000 in Indian football
India